Mallampet is a village situated at Quthbullapur Mandal, Medchal district, Telangana, India.  It is 2 km from Bachupally, 6 km from Nizampet junction, 10 km away from Kukatpally.

Commercial area
Mallampet is a small village. It is very close to trading areas like Bachupally, Nizampet and Miyapur, which are big shopping hubs. Mallampet is about 5 mins from Bachupally, 15 mins from Miyapur and 45 mins distance from Hitech City. The village is in close proximity to top engineering and residential junior colleges.

Outer Ring Road

The 159-kilometer Outer Ring Road of Hyderabad is passing through Mallampet. It is a 6-lane, 500-feet wide road. This has led to growth in real estate activity with many residential ventures coming up in Bachupally. It has significantly reduced the distance, travel time and access to different parts of the city. The Praneeth Pranav Gems Gated Community (Independent/Duplex Villas) is located in Mallampet, adjacent to ORR. A Praneeth Pranav Leaf is new villa project with 500+ picturesque villas, is coming soon in Mallampet.

Schools and Temples
Mallampet is near to lot of good schools and colleges. Schools like Oakridge, Sentia, Kennedy High, Creek, Gitanjali and Silver Oaks and colleges like Narayana, Chaitanya and Vignan Jyothi are in and around Bachupally.
There is a pochamma Temple in heart of Mallampet Village.

Villages around Mallampet
 Bachupally 
 Nizampet
 Kazipally
 Shambipur
 IDA Bollaram
 Miyapur

References

External links
Dept. of School education, Mallampet

Villages in Ranga Reddy district